The 1967 Georgia Bulldogs football team represented the Georgia Bulldogs of the University of Georgia during the 1967 NCAA University Division football season.

Schedule

Source: 1968 Georgia Bulldogs Football Media Guide/Yearbook

Roster

Game summaries

Georgia Tech

Source:

References

Georgia
Georgia Bulldogs football seasons
Georgia Bulldogs football